Vijciems Parish is an administrative unit of Valka Municipality, Latvia.

Towns, villages and settlements of Vijciems Parish 
  - parish administrative center
 Mežmuiža

References 

Parishes of Latvia
Valka Municipality